Events of 2020 in Fiji.



Incumbent

Government of Fiji 
President: George Konrote
Prime Minister: Frank Bainimarama
 Speaker: Epeli Nailatikau

Cabinet of Fiji

Ongoing events  
COVID-19 pandemic in Fiji

Events by month

January 
Reserve Bank of Fiji anticipates Fiji's economy to grow by 1.7% in 2020.
Drama precedes SODELPA court hearing at Civil High Court In Suva.
Wuhan Coronavirus: Everything toned down says Fijian student in Wuhan.
Poster boys of honesty badged as Nasinu Muslim College Prefects. 
International Social Security Association Pacific Desk Office opens. 
81 Chinese nationals that arrived into Dravuni, Kadavu and Suva via cruise liner Majestic Princess were marked safe by health officials.

February 
 Coca-Cola games begins with zone 1 kicking off. 
Missing eight at sea found, had no idea search and rescue was activated. 
Coronavirus may interrupt supply chains in Fiji. 
New Zealand Prime Minister Jacinda Arden state visit to Fiji.

March 
Fiji confirms its first case of COVID-19. 
Schools all over Fiji closed indefinitely till April 17.
Attorney General and Minister for Economy Aiyaz Sayed-Khaiyum revealed the COVID-19 response budget.
Prime Minister Frank Bainimarama announced a nationwide curfew from 8pm to 5am. 
Fiji National University extend its mid-semester break.
Lautoka, Suva and part of Labasa under lockdown. 
Fiji records 5 cases at the end of March.

April 
 561 Fijians repatriated, 1157 visitors evacuated and 87,000 kg exports freighted by Fiji Airways.
21 tests conducted. Confirmed cases still at 16.
Cyclone Harold hits Fiji. A 66-year-old man in Kadavu died.
The Government of Australia pledged A$350,000 in aid to Fiji for Harold relief efforts. 
The High Commissioner of New Zealand to Fiji, Jonathan Curr, pledged humanitarian and disaster and relief for Fiji from New Zealand.
At the end of April, Fiji recorded a total of 18 cases with 11 recovered.

May 
 Fourteen patients have recovered from COVID-19.

December
December 17 – Fiji imposes a curfew in anticipation of Cyclone Yasa, a Category 5 storm that is expected to make landfall on December 18.
December 19 – At least four are killed and millions of dollars in damage as Hurricane Yasa slams into Vanua Levu. 16,113 people are unable to return to their homes.

Predicted and scheduled events 
 October 10 – Fiji Day
 October 29 – The Prophet's Birthday
 November 14 – Diwali
 December 25 – Christmas Day
 December 26 – Boxing Day

Deaths

February 
February 3 – Josefa Rika, cricketer.
February 26 – Satya Nandan, diplomat, former representative to the U.N. and former ambassador to the Netherlands.

April 
April 15 – Finau Mara, diplomat and politician, Ambassador-at-large.
April 21 – Laisenia Qarase, former Prime Minister and politician.

May 
May 18 – Raman Pratap Singh, politician, president of the National Federation Party.

June 
June 4 – Giyannedra Prasad, lawyer and politician, member and former Deputy Speaker of Parliament.

July 
July 18 – Alefoso Yalayalatabua, rugby union player.

November
November 26 – Tevita Momoedonu, 74, politician, Prime Minister of Fiji (2000, 2001).

See also 

2020–21 South Pacific cyclone season
2020–21 South Pacific cyclone season
Cyclone Harold
2020 in Oceania
COVID-19 pandemic in Fiji

References 

 
2020 in Oceania